Catherine Miller (born December 22, 1991) is a Trinidadian model and beauty pageant titleholder who won Miss Trinidad and Tobago 2013 and represented her country at the Miss Universe 2013 pageant.

Early life
Miller is recent graduate of the Savannah College of Art and Design where she obtained her Bachelor of Fine Arts in Creative Advertising.

Pageantry

Miss Trinidad & Tobago 2013
Miller was crowned as the new Miss Trinidad & Tobago in 2013 on September 21, 2013 and gained the right to represent Trinidad & Tobago at Miss Universe 2013. The pageant finale was held at One Woodbroke Place.

Miss Universe 2013
Miller represented Trinidad & Tobago at the 62nd annual Miss Universe pageant and became 2nd runner-up in the Best in National Costume award. She was unplaced during the Coronation. Gabriela Isler of Venezuela won the said pageant.

References

External links
Official Miss Trinidad and Tobago website

1992 births
Living people
People from Port of Spain
Trinidad and Tobago people of British descent
Trinidad and Tobago beauty pageant winners
Miss Universe 2013 contestants